Big Lick may refer to:

Big Lick, North Carolina, a populated place
Big Lick, Virginia, a former name of Roanoke
 The HD-2 channel of WCLT-FM, a radio station (100.3 FM) licensed to Newark, Ohio, United States
 "big lick" by Soring, a way a Tennessee show horse walks done by controversial and illegal Soring